The United States participated in World War II in different ways:
United States home front during World War II
Military history of the United States during World War II

See also
United States non-interventionism before entering World War II